A Song for You is a 1933 German musical comedy film directed by Joe May and starring Jan Kiepura, Jenny Jugo and Paul Kemp. It was shot at the Babelsberg Studios in Berlin and on location in Naples and Vienna.The film's sets were designed by the art director Werner Schlichting. It was remade in Britain the following year as My Song for You.

Cast

See also
All for Love (1933 film) (Tout pour l'amour, French-language film, 1933)
My Song for You (film) (English-language film, 1934)

References

Bibliography 
 Klaus, Ulrich J. Deutsche Tonfilme: Jahrgang 1933. Klaus-Archiv, 1988.

External links

Films of the Weimar Republic
German musical comedy films
1933 musical comedy films
Films directed by Joe May
UFA GmbH films
Operetta films
German multilingual films
Films set in Vienna
Films set in Naples
Films scored by Bronisław Kaper
Cine-Allianz films
German black-and-white films
Films shot at Babelsberg Studios
1933 multilingual films
1930s German films